M. sativa may refer to:
 Madia sativa, the coast tarweed or Chilean tarweed, a flowering plant species native to the Americas
 Medicago sativa, the alfalfa, a flowering plant species cultivated as an important forage crop

See also
 Sativa